The 2004 Rolex 24 at Daytona was a Grand-Am Rolex Sports Car Series 24-hour endurance sports car race held on January 31–February 1, 2004 at the Daytona International Speedway road course. The race served as the first round of the 2004 Rolex Sports Car Series. The race was won by the No. 54 Doran JE4-Pontiac entered by Bell Motorsports and driven by Terry Borcheller, Forest Barber, Andy Pilgrim, and Christian Fittipaldi, marking the first time that the Daytona Prototype class won the race overall. The GT class was won by the No. 44 Porsche 996 GT3-RS entered by Orbit Racing and driven by Mike Fitzgerald, Robin Liddell, Johnny Mowlem, Joe Policastro, and Joe Policastro Jr. The SGS class was won by the No. 93 Porsche 996 GT3 Cup entered by Doncaster Racing and driven by Jean-François Dumoulin, Marc Lieb, Robert Julien, and Greg Pootmans.

Race results
Class winners in bold.

External links
 Official Results
 Car information and images

24 Hours of Daytona
2004 in American motorsport
2004 in sports in Florida